State Road 514 (SR 514), known locally as Malabar Road, is a  east–west highway that serves eastern Palm Bay and Malabar. It is the only east–west major road in Brevard County to be in both the 27th and 28th degrees latitude.

Route description
SR 514's western terminus is at the interchange with Interstate 95 at exit 173, where the road continues west as County Road 514. Through the city of Palm Bay, Florida, the road is a minimum of four lanes. This narrows down to two lanes as it enters Malabar. The route passes Palm Bay Hospital on the north side. Weber Road and Corey Road, the two major north-south highways through Malabar, both intersect State Road 514. Between the town limits of Malabar and U.S. Route 1, the speed limit decreases from 50 MPH to 30 MPH with two lanes. Both the Town Hall of Malabar and the fire department are located on this road.

Future

Causeway 
There is a proposed causeway over the Indian River Lagoon east of U.S. Route 1, that would extend the state road for two miles (3 km). Because of a condominium community on the barrier island, it would steer away from it and head directly east–west to State Road A1A.

Improvements 
In February 2017, the town of Malabar, Florida sent a packet of information to Florida's governor Rick Scott about the numerous problems plaguing the eastern portion of the road. This included recommendations to expand the current two lanes to four in order to align with the portion of road in Palm Bay, Florida as well as adding various traffic control features at several dangerous intersections (such as Weber Road), installing an additional turning lane for Palm Bay Hospital and adding a caution light at the Malabar Fire Department.

Major intersections

References

External links

514
514
514